Constantin Dmitrievich Perskyi (Константин Дмитриевич Перский) (2 June 18545 April 1906) was a Russian scientist who is credited with coining the word television (télévision) in a paper that he presented in French at the 1st International Congress of Electricity, which ran from 18 to 25 August 1900 during the International World Fair in Paris. At the time, he was Professor of Electricity at the Artillery Academy of Saint Petersburg. His paper referred to the work of other experimenters in the field, including Paul Gottlieb Nipkow and Porfiry Ivanovich Bakhmetiev, who were attempting to use the photoelectric properties of selenium as the basis for their research in the field of image transmission.

Biography
Konstantin Perskyi was born on 21 May (2 June in Julian calendar), 1854 in Tver Governorate. He belonged to a noble family founded by a person who had moved out of Persia in the service of the grand prince of Dmitry Donskoy.

He studied in Michalovsky Artillery College, and after graduation was a member of the squadron headed by the heir to the throne, the future tsar of Russia Alexander III. He took part in the Russo-Turkish War (1877—1878) and was awarded by the Order of Saint Anna for bravery.
In 1882 graduated from Michaylovsky Military Artillery Academy.
In 1883—1886 studied in Nikolay General Staff Academy, but was dismissed for private reasons.
His further service was in St. Petersburg as a head of a ammunition (cartridge) workshop, and then of the whole factory currently named after M.I Kalinin.
Was a professor of electric technique in Artillery Academy.

Konstantin Perskyi played an important role in social life of St. Petersburg, was a member of Russian Technical Society, and an academic secretary of the Electrotechnic Society, took part in All-Russia Electrotechnic Meetings.

Practical studies of Persky were mostly related to creation and development of gunnery (artillery) equipment.

In 1899 he presented the report «Современное состояние вопроса об электровидении на расстоянии (телевизирование)» at the First All-Russia Electrotechnic Congress in Saint Petersburg. Then, he presented the same report on 24 August 1900 in Paris at IV International Electrotechnic Congress that was held under auspices of Exposition Universelle, where he first used the term of television widely used afterwards. In Russia the term was used only a few years later.

On 5 April 1906, Colonel Perskyi was ranked Major-General and dismissed from service for health reasons and was awarded with pension, but died soon after.

See also
History of television

Notes

References
Constantin Perskyi, "Television by means of electricity", from the International World Fair of 1900, International Congress of Electricity (Paris, 18–25 August 1900), reported under the authority of Mr. E. Hospitalier, General Reporter, Gauthier-Villars, printer and publisher, Paris, 1901.  (French) text
The Electrician, London, 21 September 1900
 Perskyi coins word "television" (25 August 1900)

Russian physicists
Russian inventors
Television pioneers
1854 births
1906 deaths